Rhoud El Baguel is a village in the commune of El Borma, in El Borma District, Ouargla Province, Algeria.

References

Neighbouring towns and cities

Populated places in Ouargla Province